Australian rules football in Tasmania (known locally as "football"), has been played since the late 1870s and draws the largest audience for a football code in the state.

While support for the Australian Football League competition remains in the state, and population growth has exceeded the national average, Australian rules football at the grassroots has been in freefall since 2006. The number of participants halved during the 2000s and has not recovered since. Once a heartland of the sport and the strongest state for the sport in the country, its participation rate per capita has dropped below the national average and is now similar to the sport in the Australian Capital Territory and only marginally higher than that of Australian rules football in New South Wales and in Queensland. The popularity of cricket and basketball has in recent decades also significantly surpassed Australian rules. Total participation was overtaken by soccer in the state for the first time in its history in 2020. While the code remains popular in the state's north and Launceston, its popularity has fared much worse in the south and in the state's capital Hobart. With the collapse of numerous clubs and competitions, the sport has undergone numerous restructures over the years and the general consensus is that the state suffered from being ignored by national governing bodies for decades. This prompted the Government of Australia to launch a Senate inquiry in 2008.

The Tasmanian team competed in senior interstate and State of Origin football; it won matches against all other Australian states (including Victoria, firstly in their 1960 match and most recently in their second last encounter in 1990) as well as several second division titles (including 1908 and 1947). The side played its last senior representative match in 1993. Tasmania continues to field underage sides in the national underage championships as part of a talent pathway to the AFL and remains a successful side with 8 Division two titles, the most recent in 2018. Tasmania has also fielded teams in the VFL (2001–2008), the TAC Cup (1996–2002; 2019-) and defeated a NEAFL representative side in 2013 as the Tasmania Mariners/Devils. Despite efforts to maintain a pathway to the AFL, in the 2010s and 2020s Tasmania began to produce poorly in the AFL Draft and for the first time in history (including 2020 and 2022) missed AFL Draft selection altogether. Attendance at matches, per capita, up to the 2000s and 2010s were the highest in Australia. Tasmanian crowds at VFL matches averaged 4,000 a season until the Devils unpopular alignment with AFL club North Melbourne began in 2006. AFL matches involving non-Tasmanian clubs averaged over 16,000 per game until North Melbourne began playing home games in Hobart in 2011. Tasmanian television audiences for the AFL were also among the highest per capita, consistently drawing bigger ratings than both Queensland and New South Wales, however they too declined in the 2010s.

Over 300 Tasmanians have played the game at the highest level, the AFL. Tasmania has four Australian Football Hall of Fame legends: Darrell Baldock, Peter Hudson, Ian Stewart and Royce Hart. Matthew Richardson has the most AFL goals for a Tasmanian with 800. The highest profile current men's player is Jack Riewoldt who also holds the Tasmanian record for most AFL games. Current women's player Jess Wuetschner holds the AFLW games and goals records for a Tasmanian.

An $150 million government backed Tasmanian AFL bid made in 2021 for entry in 2027 (after numerous bids since 1994 had been rejected by the AFL) was scheduled to be voted on by the 18 AFL club presidents in late September 2022. The AFL reached an in principle agreement with the Tasmanian government in November 2022. However the AFL has stated that its granting of a license is conditional on approval of construction of a $750 million new roofed stadium in central Hobart, which, as of 2023, had not received any funding commitment from the federal government.

History

English public school games: 1851-1879
Organised "Foot-ball" matches have been recorded in Van Diemens Land since 1851 and matches in southern Tasmanian towns of Hobart and Richmond between 1853 and 1855 significantly pre-date those recorded across Bass Strait in suburban Melbourne.

Rugby historian Sean Fagan claims that early matches played in Tasmania may have been an early form of rugby football, pointing to early mentions of goal posts with cross-bars and offside rules of later Tasmanian clubs.

Accounts from Tasmanians of these early matches indicate that, as in early Victoria, they played mostly English public school football games rules particularly Rugby football, Harrow football and Eton football (the latter being similar to soccer) among others.

However, apart from the fact that they were organised and played, few details of these matches actually survive, and the popularity of football in the fast-growing colony of Victoria quickly eclipsed the following that the pastime had in newly named colony of Tasmania.

First football clubs appear: 1864-1878
The "football" club formed in New Town in 1864 is believed to be the earliest in Tasmania – but disbanded soon after. A series of high profile matches were played between New Town and Hobart Football Club (now defunct) in 1866, though it is not not known under which rules, though it is likely to have been under Victorian Rules. Significantly not long later, cricket clubs passed a motion prohibiting football from being played on their grounds.

By the mid- to late 1860s, more stable clubs, including Derwent and Stowell Football, emerged.

In 1871 the Break O'Day club was formed followed in 1875 by the Launceston Football Club and Launceston Church Grammar School  in 1876.

Even by 1876, Tasmanian clubs had not decided on which rules to play. "Victorian Football Rules" began to gain favour only as the strong growth of the code in Victoria and Queensland became evident, even still most clubs preferred to play by their own rules

Other clubs to form were Longford (1878) and Cornwall (1879), which became City in 1880. The City and Richmond clubs were formed in 1877 and the Oatlands and Railway clubs in 1879.

New Town formally started in 1878 and along with City and Richmond formed the basis of the game in Hobart, while in Launceston the abovementioned clubs formed the basis for the NTFA. New Norfolk District Football Club (1878) was one of the stronger regional clubs and North Hobart Football Club (1881) is another survivor of these early years.

Intercolonial football and adoption of the Victorian Rules: 1879

On 1 May 1879 members of the Tasmanian Cricket Association met and decided to form a club for their members, to be called Cricketers. They initially adopted English Association Rules (soccer) before succumbing to the pressure to play Victorian Rules.

In 1879 the Hotham Football Club (now North Melbourne) wrote to Tasmanian clubs for an intercolonial challenge. The Tasmanians initially deferred the challenge due to no uniform rules among its clubs. On July 5, 1881 it played a combined Hobart team defeated them 3 goals 2 in front of 1500 spectators. Following the intercolonial, Tasmanian clubs adopted a slightly modified version of the Victorian game.

More intercolonials against Victorian clubs followed shortly after the official adoption of the code. The Essendon Football Club visited in 1882 playing against a combined Tasmanian side in front of more than 3,000 spectators.

An Intra-state rivalry develops: 1900-

The history of local Tasmanian football differs considerably from any of the mainland states. Whereas mainland states had a major population centre around which a single dominant league was based, Tasmania's population was more evenly distributed. The consequences of this on Tasmanian football history are three-fold: firstly, a strong intrastate rivalry not noted in any mainland state; secondly, three different top-level football leagues in different regions of the state; and thirdly, the ability for teams representing very small towns to be competitive in the top leagues.

The Tasmanian Football League, based around Hobart, began in 1879. The Northern Tasmanian Football Association, based around Launceston, began in 1886.

Victorian clubs Fitzroy Football Club and Collingwood Football Club visited in 1901 and 1902 respectively winning convincingly against the NTFA.

A third top-level league, although not recognised as such until later, was the North West Football Union, contested by teams on the north-western coast of the state west of Latrobe, which began in 1910.

Victorian club Collingwood FC again visited Launceston in 1923 and played against the NTFA.

The leagues were small in the pre-WWI era, with only three clubs competing in the TFL and NTFA, and four in the NWFU. Intrastate games between representative teams in the leagues were a regular fixture during these years. In the 1920s, the TANFL (as the TFL was now known) and NFTA expanded to four teams apiece, and the NWFU to six.

In 1929, Victorian club Collingwood FC again visited both Launceston and Hobart, playing against the NTFA and SFA respectively.

After World War II, all leagues underwent further expansion. The TANFL switched to a district-based selection, and expanded to six clubs. The NFTA also expanded to six teams. The NWFU expanded from six teams to as many as fourteen, with a short-lived incorporation of four Circular Head-based clubs, but eventually contracted back to eight.

The local leagues were extremely popular and attracted large crowds. The TANFL Grand Final between Glenorchy and Clarence at the North Hobart Oval in 1979 attracted a record crowd of 24,968 which, although ostensibly small in comparison to mainland crowds, represented 15% of Hobart's population at the time.

Statewide Competition
There were always attempts made to somehow consolidate the major Tasmanian leagues into one statewide competition. The earliest and longest-lasting was the Tasmanian State Premiership, which began (officially) in 1909 as a single Grand Final game between the TANFL and NTFA premiers, for the right to be the State Premiers. The Hobart-based teams initially dominated, winning the first fourteen such contests. In 1950, the NWFU Premier was also invited to contest for the State Premiership. The final State Premiership was played in 1978.

The next attempt at statewide competition was the Winfield Statewide Cup, a seven-week tournament played prior to the 1980 season amongst all twenty teams in the TANFL, NTFA and NWFU, plus one team from the Circular Head Football Association (Smithton, who would join the NWFU that season). The competition was not popular with the northern clubs, who believed the organisation of the league biased towards the Hobart-based league. In response, they refused to play another Winfield Statewide Cup. Instead, the NTFA and NWFU joined to form the Greater Northern Football League, which resembled the old Statewide Premiership format, with the winners of the individual leagues playing off for the GNFL premiership. The GNFL experiment lasted only the 1981 and 1982 seasons.

In 1986 and 1987, a true Statewide League was finally realised, when five of the northern clubs left their respective leagues to join the TANFL, renamed the TFL Statewide League: North Launceston, East Launceston and City-South left the NTFA in 1986 (the latter two merging to form South Launceston), and Devonport and Cooee (which was renamed Burnie for the move) left the NWFU in 1987. The two northern leagues merged to form the Northern Tasmanian Football League.

From that point, Tasmanian local football slowly dwindled as teams began to lose money. Clubs began to leave both the NTFL and the Statewide league throughout the 1990s, returning to local or amateur competitions with lower travel costs, or in some cases (such as the TANFL's Sandy Bay Football Club) fold completely. Only six teams remained in the Statewide League by 2000, and after one of the most poorly attended Grand Finals in seventy years, the league folded. The clubs that survived returned to the NTFL and the newly formed Southern Football League.

The Tasmanian Devils and the VFL
Upon the disbanding of the TFL in 2000, the Tasmanian Devils was formed in 2001 and admitted into the Victorian Football League in its inaugural year. The team played home games in Launceston, Hobart, Ulverstone, Burnie and Devonport during its time in the league. The Devils attracted a strong following in comparison with many other VFL clubs at the time.

AFL aligns North Melbourne with Tasmania (2006)
At the start of the 2006 season the Devils and the Australian Football League's North Melbourne Football Club began a partial alignment, allowing six North Melbourne listed players to play for Tasmania when not selected in the seniors, and arrangement which lasted from 2006 until 2007. This was unpopular among local fans, significantly harming the popularity of the club; and the season proved to be a disappointment on-field, with the Devils finishing ninth and missing the finals.

The Devils were wound up at the conclusion of the 2008 season in order to make room for the return of the TFL in 2009.

Tasmania and the National AFL Competition (1990-)

Tasmania's State of Origin strong State of Origin team was one of the main reasons that the state held off expressing serious interest in joining the AFL competition. The state's historically strong supporter base for Australian rules football, one of the highest participation rates in the country and strong local leagues were also factors. However the team's strong performances against Victoria in the early 1990s prompted Tasmanian officials to open talks with the AFL.

Tasmania was seen as a relocation target for the AFL's struggling clubs and in 1991 the Fitzroy Football Club were contracted for two home games a season at North Hobart Oval however the experiment ended in 1992 when the venture resulted in a large financial loss for the Lions.

After the state side's last representative appearance in 1993, Tasmania stepped up its bids for inclusion in the national competition.

Between 1996 and 1998 a bid was prepared that involved the construction of a 30,000-capacity stadium in the Hobart showgrounds in Glenorchy, at the cost of $34 million. The stadium would have been the team's only home ground, but the appeal was unsuccessful and the stadium was not built.

In 2001, AFL clubs St Kilda and Hawthorn began playing home matches in Launceston at York Park (later known as Aurora Stadium), supported by the Tasmanian government in an attempt to build a local following. St Kilda ended its arrangement after 2006. Hawthorn however increased its presence in the state as part of an agreement with the tourism component of the Tasmanian government, whereby they were contracted to play four games in the state and the Tasmanian Government will be the major sponsor for the club.

A government-backed Tasmanian bid was prepared in response to the AFL admitting new licences for the Gold Coast and Western Sydney for the 2010 and 2011 seasons.  While the AFL admitted that the state had put together a stronger business case, it was once again rejected by the league.  AFL CEO Andrew Demetriou was quoted to have said to the Tasmanian premier Paul Lennon "Not now, not ever". Hobart's major daily newspaper The Mercury started a petition in response to this news on 16 April 2008. The premier vowed to bypass the AFL CEO and take the appeal directly to the AFL Commission.

On 30 July, the Tasmanian government announced that it had secured a major sponsor, Mars for the bid in a deal worth $4 million over 3 years.  It was long doubted by the AFL that the Tasmanian club would secure corporate interest before a proposal is accepted by the AFL and this announcement came as a major shock as it was before a sponsor could be found for either the Gold Coast or Western Sydney Clubs and as AFL clubs Richmond and Western Bulldogs was left without a major sponsor for 2009.  In addition to the Gemba financial audit of the bid to meet the AFL criteria, the Tasmania team had secured more than 20,000 potential members, ahead of the Gold Coast and Western Sydney bid in raw numbers.

Hawthorn Football Club (2001-)
Since 2001 Hawthorn has successfully cultivated a following in Tasmania playing numerous home games at York Park with its Tasmanian membership base has increased from 1,000 to more than 9,000. Recent studies have valued Hawthorn's economic impact in Tasmania and national brand exposure to total $29.5 million in 2014. Since 2006, Hawthorn has increased its presence in the state as part of an agreement with the tourism component of the Tasmanian government, whereby they are contracted to play four games in the state and the Tasmanian Government will be the major sponsor for the club. This relationship was renewed for a further period for five years (2012–16) in November 2011.

On 31 July 2015, Hawthorn extended their partnership with Tasmania for a further five years.

North Melbourne Football Club (2012-)
The North Melbourne Football Club has confirmed that it will play two games per year in Hobart at Bellerive Oval starting from 2012.

The Return of the Statewide League (2009-)
After an eight-year absence, the Tasmanian Football League made a return in 2009. Ten teams were initially represented: from the south, North Hobart, Glenorchy, Hobart, Clarence, Lauderdale; from the north, Launceston, North Launceston, South Launceston; and from the north-western coast, Burnie and Devonport. All clubs except for Lauderdale had at some stage been part of the original Statewide League.

The league's membership underwent changes in 2014. South Launceston left the league and was replaced by the newly established Western Storm, based in western Launceston; North Hobart was disbanded and reincorporated into a new club called Hobart City; and Hobart, which was to have been a joint partner in the Hobart City club before withdrawing from the deal, was replaced by the Tigers FC, based in Kingston.

Participation
In 2019, there were 14,465 participants, player numbers have halved in just over a decade and the participation had plunged to 3.3, ranking 5th in the country ahead of only NSW/ACT and Queensland.

In 2007, there were 4,500 senior players and a total of 32,138 participants in Aussie Rules in Tasmania. A total participation per capita of 5% is the second-highest participation in the country, behind the Northern Territory.

Audience

Attendance record
 24,968 (1979). TFL Grand Final Glenorchy v Clarence (North Hobart Oval, Hobart)

Major Australian Rules Events in Tasmania
Australian Football League Premiership Season (Hawthorn (Launceston) and North Melbourne (Hobart) 'home' games)
Tasmanian State League Grand Final
Southern Football League Grand Final
Northern Tasmanian Football League Grand Final

Tasmanian Football Team of the Century
In 2004 the Board of Management of AFL Tasmania named a Team of the Century for the state. It had 18 on field and seven interchange players as well as an umpire, coach and assistant coach.

 Assistant coach – Robert Shaw
 Umpire – Scott Jeffery

Representative Side

The Tasmanian representative team have played State of Origin test matches against all other Australian states. The team's last appearance was at the 1993 State of Origin Championships.

The team wears and all green guernsey with maroon trims and a gold insignia map of Tasmania more recently an embossed T symbol for Tasmania.

Tasmania fields Underage teams at both Under 16 and Under 18 levels in both the AFL Under 19 Championships and 2021 AFL Women's Under 19 Championships.

See Also Interstate matches in Australian rules football

A combined state team usually plays other state competitions around Australia, such as AFL Queensland in 2007, 2009, and 2010.

Governing body
The governing body for Aussie Rules in Tasmania is AFL Tasmania.

In 2009 the three main community football leagues The Northern Tasmanian Football League, Northern Tasmanian Football Association, and the Southern Football League established the Tasmanian Football Council which is a united body that represents community Footballs interests in the state. The council has membership with the Australian Amateur Football Council.

The Tasmanian government set up the Football Tasmania Board in 2019 to provide advice to the government on the state of the game in Tasmania.

Leagues & Clubs

State Leagues/clubs (past and present)

Current clubs 
 Clarence
 Glenorchy
 Hobart City (rebrand of North Hobart from 2014–2017)
 Lauderdale
 Launceston
 North Hobart (rebranded as Hobart City in 2013 and returned 2018)
 North Launceston
 Kingborough Tigers (from 2014)

Former clubs

Tasmanian Football League 
 Cooee / Burnie Hawks / Burnie Tigers / Burnie Dockers Football Club (exited league in 2018)
 Cananore (pre-WW2)
 Devonport (exited league in 2017)
 Hobart (exited league in 2013)
 Lefroy (pre-WW2)
 New Norfolk
 North Hobart (exited league in 2013)
 Sandy Bay
 East Launceston / South Launceston (exited league in 2013)
 Southern Districts
 Western Storm

Northern Tasmanian Football Association 
 City / City-South / South Launceston
 Deloraine FC (also spent two seasons in the NWFU)
 Cornwall / East Launceston / South Launceston
 George Town FC (also in NTFL)
 Longford
 Scottsdale

North West Football Union 
 Burnie Dockers
 Cooee
 East Devonport
 Latrobe
 Penguin
 Smithton
Ulverstone
Wynyard
Tasmanian Amateur Football League (League had southern and northern divisions with a state amateur premiership)
Tasmanian State Premiership
Winfield Statewide Cup
Tasmanian Devils (Victorian Football League) (2001–2008)

Local Leagues
Circular Head Football Association
Darwin Football Association
King Island Football Association
Northern Tasmanian Football Association
Northern Tasmanian Football League
North Western Football Association
Oatlands District Football Association
Old Scholars Football Association
Southern Football League

Defunct Local Leagues

Deloraine Football Association
East Tamar Football Association – To the 'Tamar Football Association'
Esk Football Association
Esk Deloraine Football Association
Esperance Football Association
Fingal District Football Association
Huon Football Association
Kingborough Football Association
Leven Football Association
Midlands Football Association
North East Football Union
North West Christian Amateur Football League
North West Football Union
Northern Tasmanian Football Association (original)
Peninsula Football Association
South East Districts Football Association
Southern Districts Football Association
Tasman Football Association
Tamar Football Association – To the ‘Northern Tasmanian Football Association’ (new)
West Tamar Football Association – To the 'Tamar Football Association'
Western Tasmanian Football Association

Junior
Northern Tasmanian Junior Football Association (NTJFA)
Northern Tasmanian Junior Football League (NTJFL)
Southern Tasmania Junior Football League

Masters
Masters Australian Football Tasmania

Umpires
TFUA – Tasmanian Football Umpires Association
NTFUA – Northern Tasmanian Football Umpires Association
NWUA – North West Umpires Association

Women's

Tasmanian Women's Football League
The Tasmanian Women's Football League (TWFL) was established in 2007 and there are now 8 women's teams in the league statewide. These are:

Burnie Dockers, Clarence Football Club, Evandale, Glenorchy Football Club, Launceston Football Club, Mersey Leven, South East Suns, Tiger City.

Grand Final results
 2008 – Clarence Roos...
 2009 – Clarence Roos...
 2010 – Launceston FC...
 2011 – Clarence Roos...
 2012 – Clarence Roos...
 2013 – Clarence Roos...
 2014 – Burnie
 2015 – Clarence Roos
 2016 – Burnie

Tasmanian State League Woman's
On Wednesday 19 April 2017, AFL Tasmania announced the formation of the TSLW. A five-team woman's league which will comprise:
 Clarence
 Burnie Dockers
 Glenorchy
 Launceston
 Tigers FC.

They will compete over a 15-round season, commencing on Saturday 29 April 2017.

Regional Women's Leagues

SFLW
 Blues
 Claremont Women
 Demons Women
 Port Women
 South East Suns Women

NTFAW (2019)
 Bridgenorth
 Evandale
 George Town
 Meander Valley
 Old Launcestonians (OLFC)
 Old Scotch
 Scottsdale
 South Launceston

TWL North West
 Circular Head Giants
 Devonport Magpies
 Latrobe
 Penguin
 Ulverstone

Principal Venues
The following venues meet AFL Standard criteria and have been used to host AFL (National Standard) or AFLW level matches (Regional Standard) are listed by capacity.

Players

Tasmania has supplied over 300 players to the elite level.

Greats 
Tasmania has three Australian Football Hall of Fame legends: St Kilda and Latrobe premiership captain and three-time Wander Medallist Darrel Baldock, dual Leitch Medallist and twelve-time league goalkicking champion Peter Hudson and three-time Brownlow Medallist Ian Stewart.

Other players from Tasmania include Hall of Fame inductees Royce Hart, Vic Belcher, Horrie Gorringe, Matthew Richardson, Laurie Nash.

AFL Tasmania also maintains its own Tasmanian Football Hall of Fame with hundreds of footballers, many of whom also played in the AFL.

AFL Recruitment Zones
In the absence of a Tasmanian AFL club, the Australian Football League granted its North Melbourne Football Club full access to Tasmania via its Academy Recruitment Zone since 2016. This also meant that when North Melbourne entered the AFLW in 2019, it was given access to the Tasmanian talent from across the league so as to act as Tasmania's team in the competition. Other clubs may access Tasmanians that are overlooked or via the rookie draft.

Men's

Current Players

AFL Players from Tasmania

Women's

Current Players

AFLW players from Tasmania

References

 AFL Tasmania
 Australian Football League

Sources

External links
AFL Tasmania official website
Southern Football (Archive, 9 Mar 2013)
Tasmanian Branch of Masters (Archive, 15 Feb 2009)
Tasmanian Umpires (Archive, 28 May 2012)

 
Tas
History of Australian rules football